El Amor de Mi Tierra is the ninth album by Colombian singer/composer Carlos Vives released on October 19, 1999.

Track listing
 "El Amor de Mi Tierra" (M. Madera) – 3:24
 "Fruta Fresca" (M. Madera) – 3:53
 "19 de Noviembre" (C. Vives, E. Estefan, A. Chirino) – 4:37
 "Tu Amor Eterno" (C. Vives, M. Madera) – 4:03
 "La Mona" (C. Vives, A. Castro) – 4:06
 "Volver Al Valle" (C. Vives, E. Cuadrado) – 4:15
 "Cante" (C. Vives, E. Escaf) – 3:43
 "La Cartera" (C. Vives, A. Castro) – 3:19
 "Pitán-Pitán" (C. Vives, A. Castro) – 4:53
 "La Receta" (C. Vives, J. Zambrano) – 4:39
 "La Piragua" (José Barros) – 4:24

Charts

Weekly charts

Year-end charts

Sales and certifications

Personnel 

Carlos Vives - vocals, guitar 
Einar Escaf - vocals, drums 
Andrés Castro - guitar, background vocals
Mayte Montero - flute, maracas
Egidio Cuadrado - accordion, background vocals
Juan Vicente Zambrano - Producer, Arranging, programming, Keyboards
Carlos Ivan Medina - keyboards, background vocals 
Luis Angel "El Papa" Pastor - bass
Pablo Bernal - drums 
Archie Pena - congas, Cajón, Percussion 
Shango Dely - congas 
Alfredo Rosado - vallenato box
Eder Polo - guacharaca 
Ramon Benitez - bombardino 
Cheito Quinonez - background vocals

Technical personnel 

Emilio Estefan, Juan Vicente Zambrano - producers
Carlos Santos - engineer
Sebastian Krys - engineer
Juan Vicente Zambrano - programming, arranger, producer
Javier Garza - engineer
Andrés Castro - producer
Scott Canto - engineer
Cesar Sogbe - engineer
Marcelo Anez - engineer
Carlos Nieto - engineer
Alfred Figueroa - engineer
Carlos Vives - producer
Ron Taylor - engineer

References

1999 albums
Carlos Vives albums
Albums produced by Emilio Estefan